Jaïr Tjon En Fa (born 19 October 1993) is a Surinamese male  track cyclist. He began cycling at the age of 13 in 2007 in his home country Suriname. He competed in the sprint event at the 2013 UCI Track Cycling World Championships and also at the 2016 UCI Track Cycling World Championships – Men's sprint where he reached the 1/16th Final. At the 2017 UCI Track Cycling World Championships – Men's sprint he reached the 1/8th Final. He participated at the 2014 Central American and Caribbean Games in Veracruz, Mexico and won bronze in the Elite Sprint. He participated in the 2015 Pan Am Games in Toronto, Ontario, Canada where he was ranked 9th in the Men's Sprint and 6th in the Men's Keirin.

Achievements
He  won gold at the Caribbean Track Cycling Championships 2017 and bronze at the 2017 Pan American Track Cycling Championships both in the 200m Men Elite Sprint. 
In 2016 he already won silver in the Elite Sprint at the 2016 Pan American Track Cycling Championships, in Mexico, a first ever for his country.

Jaïr Tjon En Fa also won the 2017 Festival of Speed, a UCI Class 1 race in the event Men's Elite Sprint held in Trexlertown, Pennsylvania, in the United States). In 2015 already Jaïr Tjon En Fa surprisingly won the UCI sprint tournament in the Golden Wheel/UCI Champions of Sprint at the Valley Preferred Cycling Center in Trexlertown. Beating favorite Trinidad's Njisane Phillip in straight rides in a best-of-three. In 2016 he repeated this win and hold on to the crown at the UCI 9th Festival of Speed Men's Elite Sprint in Pennsylvania, USA. He won bronze in the Elite Sprint at the 2014 Central American and Caribbean Games in Veracruz, Mexico.

In 2017 he was chosen to be "Sportsman of the Year" in his country Suriname.

Results

2008
Winner Suriname National Junior Championships 2008 on the road - Paramaribo, Suriname 
Winner Suriname National Junior Championships 2008 time trial on the road - Paramaribo, Suriname

2009
  4th Place in the 2009 Ringwegrace  - Paramaribo, Suriname 
Winner 2009 Guiana Seafoods Race, (Tour de Commewijne) - Commewijne, Suriname 
Winner 2009 National Championship on the road, Elite - Paramaribo, Suriname
Winner 2009 Inter-Guiana Games on the road for juniors, team time trial - Paramaribo, Suriname  with Moses Rickets  + Murvin Arumjo  + Nigel Sloot 
Winner 2009 Inter-Guiana Games on the road for juniors, roadrace  - Paramaribo, Suriname 
  4th Place in the 2009 National Championships on the road, Individual time trial, Elite - Paramaribo, Suriname 
Silver Runner-Up in the 2009 Caribbean Junior Championships, Juvenile Boys 17.2K time trial Category on the road - Hamilton, Bermuda 
Bronze 3rd Place in the 2009 Caribbean Junior Championships, Juvenile Boys 52K Category on the road -  Hamilton, Bermuda

2010
Winner 2010 Wotula race - Suriname 
  5th Place in the 2010 Houttuin Race - Paramaribo, Suriname 
Bronze 3rd Place in the 2010 Sydney Monticieuex Race - Paramaribo, Suriname 
Runner-Up in the 2010 Tour van Posu, Groningen, Saramacca, Suriname
Winner 2010 Inter-Guiana Games, team time trial Georgetown, Guyana with Murvin Arumjo + Nigel Sloot + Leslie Cairo

2011
   8th Place in the 2011 Pan American Junior Cycling Championships (Campeonato Panamericano Pista Junior), Men Junior - Sprint - Mar del Plata, Argentina
  10th Place in the 2011 Pan American Junior Cycling Championships (Campeonato Panamericano Pista Junior), Men Junior - Keirin - Mar del Plata, Argentina
  39th Place in the 2011 UCI Juniors Track World Championships, Men Junior - Sprint - Moscow, Russia
  37th Place in the 2011 UCI Juniors Track World Championships, Men Junior - Keirin - Moscow, Russia
  45th Place in the 2011-2012 UCI World Cup II, Men Elite - Sprint - Cali, Colombia
  26th Place in the 2011-2012 UCI World Cup II, Men Elite - Keirin - Cali, Colombia

2012
  13th Place in the 2012 Pan American Cycling Championships (2012 Campeonato Panamericano Pista), Men Elite - Keirin - Mar del Plata, Argentina
  19th Place in the 2012 Pan American Cycling Championships (2012 Campeonato Panamericano Pista), Men Elite - Sprint - Mar del Plata, Argentina
Runner-Up in the 2012 Grand Prix Sprint Apeldoorn, Men Elite - Sprint - Omnisport Apeldoorn (Gelderland), the Netherlands
  13th Place in the 2012 Grand Prix Sprint Apeldoorn, Men Elite - Keirin - Omnisport Apeldoorn (Gelderland), the Netherlands
  23rd Place in the 2012-2013 UCI World Cup II, Men Elite - Sprint - Glasgow, Great Britain
  19th Place in the 2012-2013 UCI World Cup II, Men Elite - Keirin - Glasgow, Great Britain

2013
  40th Place in the 2013 UCI Track Cycling World Championships, Men Elite - Sprint - Minsk, Belarus
Winner 2013 Los Angeles Teamsprint - Los Angeles (California), USA with Matthew Baranoski  + David Espinoza  + Nathan Koch  + Geoffrey Fryer  + Steven Herzfeld 
Bronze 3rd Place in the 2013 Los Angeles Sprint, Los Angeles (California), USA

2014
    4th Place in the 2014 South American Games, Men Elite - Sprint - Santiago de Chile
    8th Place in the 2014 South American Games, Men Elite - Keirin - Santiago de Chile
Bronze 3rd Place in the 2014 Los Angeles, Men Keirin - Los Angeles (California), United States of America
Winner 2014 Los Angeles, Men Sprint - Los Angeles (California), United States of America
Bronze 3rd Place in the 2014 Central American and Caribbean Games, Men Elite - Sprint - Velodrome Xalapa Veracruz, Mexico

2015
   12th Place in the 2014-2015 UCI World Cup III, Men Elite - Sprint - Cali, Colombia
Runner-Up in the 2015 U.S. Sprint GP, (Trexlertown Champions of Sprint), Men Elite - Sprint - Trexlertown, Pennsylvania, USA
Bronze 3rd Place in the 2015 Festival of Speed - Red Robin Finals, Men Elite - Sprint - Trexlertown, Pennsylvania, USA
    6th Place in the 2015 Festival of Speed - Red Robin Finals, Men Elite - Keirin - Trexlertown, Pennsylvania, USA
    9th Place in the 2015 Pan American Games, Men Elite - Sprint - Milton Velodrome, Ontario, Canada
    6th Place in the 2015 Pan American Games, Men Elite - Keirin - Milton Velodrome, Ontario, Canada
Winner 2015 Golden Wheel Race / UCI Champions of Sprint, Men Elite - Sprint - Trexlertown, Pennsylvania, USA
    9th Place in the 2015 Pan American Track Cycling Championships, Men Elite - Sprint - Santiago de Chile
   12th Place in the 2015 Pan American Track Cycling Championships, Men Elite - Keirin - Santiago de Chile
   19th Place in the 2015-2016 UCI World Cup I, Men Elite - Sprint - Cali, Colombia
   25th Place in the 2015-2016 UCI World Cup I, Men Elite - Keirin - Cali, Colombia
   29th Place in the 2015-2016 UCI World Cup II, Men Elite - Sprint - Cambridge, New Zealand
   25th Place in the 2015-2016 UCI World Cup II, Men Elite - Keirin - Cambridge, New Zealand

2016
  32nd Place in the 2015-2016 UCI World Cup III, Men Elite - Sprint - Hong Kong Velodrome, Hong Kong
  23rd Place in the 2016 UCI Track Cycling World Championships – Men's sprint - Lee Valley VeloPark's velodrome London, Great Britain
Winner 2016 UCI US Sprint Gran Prix (2016 World Series of Bicycling), Men Elite - Sprint - Trexlertown, Pennsylvania, USA
Winner 2016 UCI Festival of Speed, (Trexlertown Champions of Sprint), Men Elite - Sprint - Trexlertown, Pennsylvania, USA
  11th Place in the 2016 UCI Festival of Speed, (Trexlertown Champions of Sprint), Men Elite - Keirin - Trexlertown, Pennsylvania, USA
Winner 2016 Milton Challenge, Men Elite - Sprint - Milton, Ontario, Canada 
Winner 2016 Milton Challenge, Men Elite - Keirin - Milton, Ontario, Canada 
Silver Runner-Up in the 2016 Pan American Track Cycling Championships, Men Elite - Sprint - Velódromo Bicentenario Aguascalientes, Mexico
   8th Place in the 2016 UCI World Cup II, Men Elite - Sprint - Omnisport Apeldoorn (Gelderland), the Netherlands

2017
   15th Place in the 2016-2017 UCI World Cup III, Men Elite - Sprint - Cali, Colombia
   16th Place in the 2017 UCI Track Cycling World Championships – Men's sprint - Hong Kong Velodrome, Hong Kong
Winner 2017 UCI US Sprint Gran Prix (2017 World Series of Bicycling), Men Elite - Sprint - Trexlertown, Pennsylvania, United States of America
   10th Place in the 2017 UCI Red Robin All-Stars, Men Elite - Keirin Final - Trexlertown, Pennsylvania United States of America
   12th Place in the 2017 UCI Fastest Man on Wheels, Men Elite - Keirin - Trexlertown, Pennsylvania, United States of America
Winner 2017 UCI Festival of Speed - Red Robin Finals, (Trexlertown Champions of Sprint), Men Elite - Sprint - Trexlertown, Pennsylvania, USA
Bronze 3rd Place in the 2017 Pan American Track Cycling Championships, Men Elite - Sprint - National Cycling Centre Balmain  Couva, Trinidad & Tobago
   8th Place in the 2017-2018 UCI World Cup III, Men Elite - Sprint - Milton, Canada
   8th Place in the 2017-2018 UCI World Cup IV, Men Elite - Sprint - Santiago de Chile, Chile

References

External links
 
 
 
 
 

1993 births
Living people
Sportspeople from Paramaribo
Surinamese track cyclists
Surinamese people of Chinese descent
Surinamese male cyclists
Sportspeople of Chinese descent
Cyclists at the 2015 Pan American Games
Pan American Games competitors for Suriname
Competitors at the 2014 Central American and Caribbean Games
Central American and Caribbean Games bronze medalists for Suriname
Competitors at the 2018 Central American and Caribbean Games
Cyclists at the 2019 Pan American Games
Central American and Caribbean Games medalists in cycling
Cyclists at the 2020 Summer Olympics
Olympic cyclists of Suriname